The Cathedral Church of All Saints is the bishop's church of the Episcopal Diocese of Milwaukee, in Milwaukee, Wisconsin, USA. The current parish is a descendant of a small mission by the Right Reverend Jackson Kemper. It is located in Milwaukee's downtown Yankee Hill neighborhood.

The Gothic Revival church building was designed by E. Townsend Mix, a noted Milwaukee architect, and constructed as Olivet Congregational Church in 1868. The building was sold to the Episcopal diocese in 1871 when the Olivet congregation faced bankruptcy, and was consecrated as a cathedral in 1898. Incense was first used at All Saints Cathedral on Epiphany, 1902.

The complex was listed on the National Register of Historic Places in 1974.

The cathedral complex, which includes the church, an attached guild hall and nearby bishop's manse, is listed on the National Register of Historic Places and was designated a Milwaukee City Landmark in 1973. The tower and steeple, approximately 200 feet tall, houses a bronze bell cast in Pittsburgh, Pennsylvania in 1867 one year before the church was built. It measures almost 40 inches in diameter at the mouth, weighs approximately 1,200 pounds and is tuned to an A. Currently, the cathedral is raising money to hang an additional five bells, tuned to F, E-flat, D, C, and B-flat. All bells will be rung by a computerized external striker, and the pre-existing bell can also be swung to ring it. Since renovation in the 1950s the steeple cross is mounted out-of-line with the facade, slightly angled towards Lake Michigan.

In the liturgical "east end" of the sanctuary, elevated on a triple-step dais of white marble, stands the high altar and triptych presented as a memorial gift to the cathedral in 1922 during the tenure of Dean Charles S. Hutchinson. The Sienna marble altar and triptych was designed and built by Eugene W. Mason, Jr. of New York City, and is of Italian Gothic styling. Embossed in the bronze door of the tabernacle is the Agnus Dei, the Lamb of God, signifying the sacrificial nature of the Eucharist. The figures on the predella (just below the center panel) are from the left: Saints Thomas Becket, Joan of Arc, St. Mary the Virgin, Francis of Assisi, and Demetrius of Alexandria.

Most of the stained glass windows in the cathedral were designed and produced in England, most by Lavers, Barraud and Westlake of London. A large rondel window of Christ the King was made by Heaton, Butler and Bayne, also of London.

Today's church features a liturgy in the Anglo-Catholic tradition. The congregation includes around 250 members.

See also
List of the Episcopal cathedrals of the United States
List of cathedrals in the United States

References

External links

All Saints Milwaukee
19th-century Episcopal church buildings
Anglo-Catholic cathedrals
Anglo-Catholic church buildings in the United States
Churches completed in 1868
Churches in Milwaukee
Churches on the National Register of Historic Places in Wisconsin
Episcopal churches in Wisconsin
Gothic Revival church buildings in Wisconsin
National Register of Historic Places in Milwaukee